Workers' Party of Social Justice is a Czech political party, often described as the major far-right extremist party in the Czech Republic. The party is not represented in any legislative body in the Czech Republic and its biggest electoral success so far has been a gain of 1,14% in the Czech legislative election in 2010. Some of the high-ranking party officials, including a Prague party leader, have been associated with neo-Nazi groups such as Národní odpor, the Czech subsidiary of an international militant neo-Nazi group. In spring 2009 the petition for the ban on the party was dismissed by the Czech Supreme Administrative Court, because, as the presiding judge stated, the applicant (Czech government) didn't manage to provide sufficient evidence in what was seen as a botched application. Following violent attacks against Czech minorities by far-right extremists (such as the Vítkov arson attack of 2009), the government filed a more detailed petition for the ban, which was discussed by the Czech Supreme Court in January and February 2010. The party was banned, making it the first instance of banning a party for its ideology in the modern history of the Czech Republic. The party was transformed into a "Party of Citizens of the Czech Republic" and the party was renamed to Workers' Party of Social Justice. The party's program was kept the same with small adjustments.

Ideology and program 

The party was formed in 2003 and received less than 1% of the vote in its first election, but shortly afterwards attracted major media attention for organizing riots in quarters of Litvínov with a significant Roma population. Afterwards, the party has managed to maintain considerable publicity by organizing a march against homosexuals in Tábor.

The party then started to emphasize a nationalist dimension of its program, mostly seeking to overhaul what they see as a favorable treatment of minorities, and engaged in radically anti-communist rhetoric; on the 20th anniversary of the collapse of Communism in Czechoslovakia, the party leader Tomáš Vandas said: "So what is the state of the society nowadays? In one word: tragic. Communists still govern us."

The party has repeatedly called for the overthrow and subversion of the Czech political system, which the party describes both as "liberal" and "totalitarian". Its official slogan for the 2009 European elections was "Resist the totalitarian regime".

The party's program includes reducing national debt while increasing old age pensions and reducing the retirement age. Some of the more concrete proposals include restrictions on foreign investment, including a total ban on purchases of real estate by foreign nationals and nationalization of certain companies.

The party also wants to restore the death penalty, criminalize "sexual deviation", including homosexuality, abolish registered partnership, reduce rights of criminal defendants and in some cases create new crimes with a retroactive effect. Some of the most controversial proposals include marking of ethnicity in ID cards and giving the police discretion to treat the arrested person inhumanly.

In international affairs, the party opposes NATO and the European Union, and demands that the Czech Republic leave those organizations. The party is strongly anti-American and seems to be pro-Russian, going as far as stating that the Czech Republic must "immediately and strongly restore its relations with Russia" Concerning other matters in international affairs, the chairman of the party arbitration commission congratulated Mahmoud Ahmadinejad of Iran after his victory in the 2009 presidential election.

Election results

European Parliament

Czech legislative election

References

 
Political parties established in 2010
Banned far-right parties
2010 establishments in the Czech Republic
Anti-Romanyist parties in the Czech Republic
Anti-Zionist political parties in the Czech Republic
Criticism of feminism
Czech fascists
Nationalist parties in the Czech Republic
Far-right political parties in the Czech Republic
Eurosceptic parties in the Czech Republic
Third Position
Far-right parties in Europe
Anti-communist parties
Neo-Nazi political parties in Europe